The Bell X-1 was the first crewed airplane to exceed the speed of sound in level flight and was the first of the X-planes.

XS-1 pilots

XS-1 flights

See also
 Bell X-1
 Chuck Yeager

References

Flight lists